Tom Fawcett (born 18 October 1995) is an American tennis player.

Fawcett has a career high ATP singles ranking of 400 achieved on 7 January 2019. He also has a career high ATP doubles ranking of 602 achieved on 15 July 2019.

Fawcett made his Grand Slam main draw debut at the 2018 US Open after receiving a wildcard into the qualifying singles draw, and mixed doubles main draw with Danielle Collins.

External links

1995 births
Living people
American male tennis players
People from Winnetka, Illinois
People from Skokie, Illinois
Stanford Cardinal men's tennis players
Tennis people from Illinois